Bulgaria participated in the 2010 Summer Youth Olympics in Singapore.

The Bulgarian squad consisted of 21 athletes competing in 12 sports: aquatics (swimming), archery, athletics, boxing, canoeing, gymnastics, judo, modern pentathlon, rowing, shooting, weightlifting and wrestling.

Medalists

Archery

Boys

Mixed Team

Athletics

Boys
Field Events

Girls
Track and Road Events

Field Events

Boxing

Boys

Canoeing

Boys

Gymnastics

Rhythmic Gymnastics 

Individual

Judo

Individual

Modern pentathlon

Rowing

Shooting

Pistol

Swimming

Weightlifting

Wrestling

Freestyle

References

External links
Competitors List: Bulgaria

2010 in Bulgarian sport
Nations at the 2010 Summer Youth Olympics
Bulgaria at the Youth Olympics